Rolls-Royce Holdings plc is a British multinational aerospace and defence company incorporated in February 2011. The company owns Rolls-Royce, a business established in 1904 which today designs, manufactures and distributes power systems for aviation and other industries. Rolls-Royce is the world's second-largest maker of aircraft engines (after General Electric) and has major businesses in the marine propulsion and energy sectors.

Rolls-Royce was the world's 16th largest defence contractor in 2018 when measured by defence revenues.

Rolls-Royce Holdings plc is listed on the London Stock Exchange, where it is a constituent of the FTSE 100 Index. At the close of London trading on 28 August 2019, the company had a market capitalisation of £4.656bn, the 85th-largest of any company with a primary listing on the London Stock Exchange.

The company's registered office is at Kings Place, near Kings Cross in London.

History

Ownership
Rolls-Royce grew from the engineering business of Henry Royce, which was established in 1884 and ten years later began to manufacture dynamos and electric cranes. Charles Rolls established a separate business with Royce in 1904 because Royce had developed a range of cars which Rolls wanted to sell. A corporate owner was incorporated in 1906 with the name Rolls-Royce Limited.

In 1971 the same company, Rolls-Royce Limited, entered voluntary liquidation because it was unable to meet its financial obligations. It remains in existence today, still in liquidation. Its business and assets were bought by the government using a company created for the purpose named Rolls-Royce (1971) Limited. Rolls-Royce Motors was separated out in 1973.  Rolls-Royce (1971) Limited currently carries on the business under the name Rolls-Royce plc.

Rolls-Royce plc returned to the stock market in 1987 under the government of Margaret Thatcher. In 2003 ownership of Rolls-Royce plc was passed to Rolls-Royce Group plc. In the same way, Rolls-Royce Group plc passed ownership on 23 May 2011 to Rolls-Royce Holdings plc. Throughout these corporate changes Rolls-Royce plc has remained the principal trading company.

Growth
The 1980s saw the introduction of a policy to offer an engine fitment on a much wider range of civil aircraft types, with the company's engines now powering 17 different airliners (and their variants) compared to General Electric's 14 and Pratt & Whitney's 10.

The civil engines business represents the company's main area of growth. Between 2010 and 2018, Rolls-Royce invested £11 billion in facilities and R&D and launched six new civil engines including the Trent XWB and the Pearl 15 for the business aviation market. It secured orders for 2,700 engines for wide-body aircraft and business jets. It expects to produce over 600 wide-body engines a year and should power over half of the world's wide-body fleet within a few years, up from 22% a decade before.

In 2023, Rolls-Royce entered into an agreement for $3.52 million of funding with the UK Space Agency for the creation of a nuclear reactor on the moon. The project is intended to provide power for space missions.

Restructuring
In 2014 and 2015, Rolls-Royce issued at least four profit warnings due to US defence cuts, a downturn in the offshore oil and gas market and its civil aerospace business, the company initiated job cuts of over 3,000 in response. Rolls-Royce had been selling many of its aero-engines in combination with long-term service contracts. Even though the company booked profits in part with the delivery of the engine, actual payments only came in over time. Between 2003 and 2015, it sold a majority of its engines with these “TotalCare” contracts. The company announced it would no longer be able to move its revenues forward from its long-term service contracts to compensate for its contracts being unprofitable in the early stages after the introduction of IFRS 15 in 2018 and its profits for 2015 would have been £900m lower than the £1.4bn it reported if it had followed the new accounting standard.

In February 2017 Rolls-Royce posted its largest ever pre-tax loss of £4.6 billion; This included a £4.4 billion writedown on financial hedges that the company uses to protect itself against currency fluctuations, and a £671 million penalty to settle bribery and corruption charges with the Serious Fraud Office (SFO), the US Department of Justice, and Brazilian authorities.

On 14 June 2018 the company announced a restructuring of the business to create three simpler decentralised units (civil aerospace, defence and power systems), to rationalise back office functions and to remove middle management functions. The cost savings should amount to £400 million per year by 2020, with an up-front restructuring cost of £500 million. Some 4,600 people are likely to leave the business out of 55,000 employed worldwide, 3,000 job losses from the UK and the rest from elsewhere in the world (15,700 of the employees work in Derby and 10,300 work elsewhere in the United Kingdom).

In August 2018 Rolls-Royce announced it was taking a charge of £554 million to cover faults with some Trent 1000 engines on Boeing 787 Dreamliners. Rather than going thousands of hours between inspections, the faults with turbine blades mean the engines currently require inspection every 300 hours of flight. In the same announcement Rolls-Royce said it would spend £450m fixing faults on the Trent 1000 in 2018, £450m in 2019 and £350m in 2020, with the work complete by 2022.

In May 2020, the company announced its intention to cut 20% of its workforce (approximately 9,000 staff) worldwide as a result of the COVID-19 pandemic. Around 3,000 job losses were expected in the UK, half of them in Derby.

In February 2021, Rolls-Royce started talks concerning an operational shutdown of its civil aerospace unit that might last for two weeks due to the impact of Covid-19 and its restrictions.

Facilities

Testing 

Design started in 2017, construction began in 2018 and it should be commissioned by mid-2020.

X-ray imaging allows to visualize the position of seals and clearances in real time while an engine is running.
While it was retrofitted on Rolls' test bed 57, test bed 80 is the first to be purpose-designed for industrial radiography.
To protect from external X-ray like 30 cm (11.8 in.) of lead, double walls are up to 8.9 ft. (2.7 m) thick (a 5.6-ft. interior wall and 3.3-ft. exterior wall) and provide acoustic insulation.
Canadian prime contractor MDS Aero Support is responsible for design and management, test systems supply, engine adapters, support systems and data acquisition and control while construction is done by Buckingham Group Contracting.

Acquisitions
Northern Engineering Industries / broken up and sold
In 1988, Rolls-Royce acquired Northern Engineering Industries (NEI), based in the North East of England, a group of heavy engineering companies mainly associated with electrical generation and power management. The group included Clarke Chapman (cranes), Reyrolle (now part of Siemens) and Parsons (now part of Siemens steam turbines). The company was renamed Rolls-Royce Industrial Power Group. It was sold off piecemeal over the next decade as the company re-focused on its core aero-engine operations following the recession of the early 1990s.

Allison Engine Company/Rolls-Royce Corporation
On 21 November 1994, Rolls-Royce announced its intention to acquire the Allison Engine Company, an American manufacturer of gas turbines and components for aviation, industrial and marine engines. The two companies had a technical association dating back to the Second World War. Rolls-Royce had previously tried to buy the company when General Motors sold it in 1993, but GM opted for a management buyout instead for $370 million. Owing to Allison's involvement in classified and export restricted technology, the 1994 acquisition was subject to investigation to determine the national security implications. On 27 March 1995, the US Department of Defense announced that the "deal between Allison Engine Co. and Rolls-Royce does not endanger national security." Rolls-Royce was, however, obliged to set up a proxy board to manage Allison and had also to set up a separate company, Allison Advanced Development Company, Inc., to manage classified programmes "that involve leading-edge technologies" such as the Joint Strike Fighter programme. In 2000, this restriction was replaced by a more flexible Special Security Arrangement. In 2001, Rolls-Royce and its LiftSystem was among the group that won the JSF contract for the F-35.

The Allison acquisition, at $525 million (equivalent to £328 million), brought four new engine types into the Rolls-Royce civil engine portfolio on seven platforms and several light aircraft applications. Allison is now known as Rolls-Royce Corporation, part of Rolls-Royce North America.

Vickers/Vinters
In 1999 Rolls-Royce acquired Vickers plc for its marine businesses. The portion retained is now Vinters Engineering Limited. Rolls-Royce sold Vickers Defence Systems (the other major Vickers area of business) to Alvis plc in 2002.

BMW joint venture / Rolls-Royce Deutschland
Rolls-Royce has established a leading position in the corporate and regional airline sector through the development of the Tay engine, the Allison acquisition and the consolidation of the BMW Rolls-Royce joint venture. In 1999, BMW Rolls-Royce was renamed Rolls-Royce Deutschland and became a 100% owned subsidiary of Rolls-Royce plc.

SAIC joint venture / Optimized Systems and Solutions
Optimized Systems and Solutions Limited (formerly known as Data Systems & Solutions) was founded in 1999 as a joint venture between Rolls-Royce plc and Science Applications International Corporation (SAIC). In early 2006, SAIC exited the joint venture agreement, making Rolls-Royce plc the sole owner.

Tognum joint venture with Daimler / Rolls-Royce Power Systems Holding GmbH
In March 2011, Rolls-Royce and Daimler AG launched a $4.2 billion public tender offer for 100 per cent of the share capital of Tognum AG, the owner of MTU Friedrichshafen – a leading high-speed industrial and marine diesel engine manufacturer, which was completed using a 50:50 joint venture company. Rolls-Royce and Daimler AG intend that the joint venture company, which also now incorporates Rolls-Royce's existing Bergen engine business, is listed on the Frankfurt Stock Exchange.

Aero Engine Controls / Rolls-Royce Controls and Data Services
Following the acquisition of Goodrich by United Technologies Corporation in July 2012, Rolls-Royce announced it would purchase Goodrich's 50% share of Aero Engine Controls to become wholly owned by Rolls-Royce.

At the June 2019 Paris Air Show, Rolls-Royce announced its acquisition of Siemens' electric propulsion branch (while they are partners on the E-Fan X demonstrator), to be completed in late 2019, employing 180 in Germany and Hungary.

Divestment

Siemens
In May 2014, Rolls-Royce sold its energy gas turbine and compressor business to Siemens for £785 million.

Kongsberg
In July 2018, Rolls-Royce sold its commercial marine business to Kongsberg for £500 million.

Nuclear services businesses
In September 2019, Rolls-Royce agreed to sell its civil nuclear services businesses in the U.S., Canada, Mondragon France, and Gateshead UK to the Westinghouse Electric Company for an undisclosed sum. These businesses had a revenue of $70 million and about 500 employees in 2018.  Rolls-Royce is keeping its nuclear new build and small modular reactor (SMR) business in the UK. In November 2020, the company announced plans to build up to 16 Rolls-Royce SMR nuclear plants across the UK, continuing its nuclear division operations. In December 2020 Rolls-Royce announced it would sell other foreign parts of its civil nuclear instrumentation and control business to Framatome as part of its post-COVID recovery plan, completing the deal involving over 550 employees in November 2021.

Major sales

Airbus A380
In 1996, Rolls-Royce and Airbus signed a memorandum of understanding, specifying the Trent 900 as the engine of choice for the then A3XX, now the Airbus A380.

In 2011, Rolls-Royce faced questions concerning incidents with its Trent 900 Turbofan used to power the Airbus A380 aircraft. One of the engines suffered a partial power loss during a Qantas flight in February 2011. This followed an incident in November 2010 in which an engine disintegrated in flight causing Qantas Flight 32 to make an emergency landing in Singapore. The aircraft was extensively damaged and the airline grounded its fleet of A380s. The problem was traced to a fatigue crack in an oil pipe requiring the replacement of some engines and modifications to the design. Trent-powered A380s operated by Lufthansa and Singapore Airlines were also affected. Qantas gradually returned its A380s to service over several months. In June 2011 the airline announced it had agreed to compensation of US$100m from Rolls-Royce.

On 17 April 2015, it was announced that Rolls-Royce had received its largest order to date worth £6.1bn ($9.2bn) to supply engines for 50 Emirates A380 planes.

Boeing
On 6 April 2004, Boeing announced that it had selected both Rolls-Royce and General Electric to power its new 787. Rolls-Royce submitted the Trent 1000, a further development of that series.

Airbus A350
In July 2006, Rolls-Royce reached an agreement to supply a new version of the Trent for the revised Airbus A350 (XWB) jetliner. This engine, the Trent XWB is an engine developed from the Trent 1000, a variant of which was offered for the original A350 proposal. As of July 2015, over 1,500 engines of this type have been supplied to 40 customers.

In October 2006, Rolls-Royce suspended production of its Trent 900 engine because of delays by Airbus on the delivery of the A380 superjumbo. Rolls-Royce announced in October 2007 that production of the Trent 900 had been restarted after a twelve-month suspension caused by delays to the A380.

Panavia Tornado, Eurofighter Typhoon and Lightning II
On the military side, Rolls-Royce, in co-operation with other European manufacturers, has been a major contractor for the RB199 which in several variants powers the Panavia Tornado, and also for the EJ200 engine for the Eurofighter Typhoon. Rolls-Royce has matured the Rolls-Royce LiftSystem invented by Lockheed Martin for the F-35 Lightning II to production level; The F-35 is planned to be produced in significant numbers.

Air China
At the 2005 Paris Air Show, Rolls-Royce secured in excess of $1 billion worth of orders. The firm received $800m worth of orders from Air China to supply its 20 Airbus A330 jets.

Qatar Airways
On 18 June 2007, Rolls-Royce announced at the 2007 Paris Air Show that it had signed its biggest ever contract with Qatar Airways for the Trent XWB to power 80 A350s on order from Airbus worth $5.6 billion at list prices. On 11 November 2007, another large contract was announced at the Dubai Airshow from Emirates for Trent XWBs to power 50 A350-900 and 20 A350-1000 aircraft with 50 option rights. Due to be delivered from 2014, the order is potentially worth up to 8.4 billion US Dollars at list prices, including options.

On 20 November 2007, Rolls-Royce announced plans to build its first Asian aero engine facility in the Seletar Aerospace Park, Singapore. The $562m (£355m) plant complements its existing facility at Derby by concentrating on the assembly and testing of large civil engines, including Trent 1000 and Trent XWB. Productivity will be higher than at Derby, as the plant is fully integrated, as opposed to manufacturing occurring across five sites in the UK: a Trent 900 will take only 14 days to manufacture, as opposed to 20 in the UK. Originally expected to provide employment for 330 people, by the start of production in 2012, 1,600 employees were based in Singapore.

Nuclear submarines
In May 2012, Rolls-Royce Marine Power Operations won a Ministry of Defence contract worth more than £400 million for the integration of the reactor design, the PWR3, for UK's next generation nuclear-armed submarines.

Corruption allegations

Rolls-Royce has been accused numerous times of corrupt practices and bribery. Most recently, in 2014, facing allegations of bribery in the aftermath of the Sudhir Choudhrie affair, Rolls-Royce offered to return money to the Indian government. The Serious Fraud Office (SFO) also investigated allegations of bribery in Indonesia and China.

In February 2015 Rolls-Royce was accused of bribing an employee of Brazil's state-controlled oil company to win a $100 million contract to provide gas turbines for oil platforms.

In October 2016 a joint Guardian and BBC investigation alleged widespread corruption by Rolls-Royce through middlemen in foreign countries including Brazil, India, China, Indonesia, South Africa, Angola, Iraq, Iran, Kazakhstan, Azerbaijan, Nigeria and Saudi Arabia. Rolls-Royce became subject to a major SFO investigation.

Alleged defects
In 2013 media reported allegations from two American ex-employees that thousands of the company's new jet engines were assembled with used parts.

Settlement with SFO
In January 2017 Rolls-Royce came to an agreement with the SFO to pay £671 million under a deferred prosecution agreement to avoid prosecution for bribery to obtain export contracts. As part of this agreement, a $170 million fine was paid to US authorities to end a bribery investigation, and $25 million to the Brazilian authorities.

Subsequent to the settlement, Private Eye reported that some of Rolls-Royce's contracts under the scope of the SFO investigation had been supported by the British government's UK Export Finance department, using taxpayers' money. The government department underwrote multimillion-pound liabilities under Rolls-Royce contracts secured with the help of bribes and "facilitation" commissions. It has also been highlighted in the press that Rolls-Royce's auditor since 1995, KPMG, had failed to identify any corrupt practices throughout the 1990s and 2000s. This is notable considering judge Brian Leveson's statement that Rolls-Royce's offending was "multi-jurisdictional, numerous", "persistent and spanned from 1989 until 2013", and it "involved substantial funds being made available to fund bribe payments".

Governance
 the board of directors consists of:

 Sir Ian Davis, Chairman
 Warren East, Chief Executive
 Panos Kakoullis, Chief Financial Officer
 Paul Adams, Independent Non-Executive Director
 George Culmer, Independent Non-Executive Director
 Irene Dorner, Independent Non-Executive Director
 Anita Frew, Independent Non-Executive Director and Chair Designate
 Beverly Goulet, Independent Non-Executive Director
 Lee Hsien Yang, Independent Non-Executive Director
 Nick Luff, Independent Non-Executive Director
 Sir Kevin Smith, Senior Independent Director
 Dame Angela Strank, Independent Non-Executive Director
 Pamela Coles, Company Secretary and Chief Governance Officer

Products

Rolls-Royce's aerospace business makes commercial and military gas turbine engines for military, civil, and corporate aircraft customers worldwide. In the United States, the company makes engines for regional and corporate jets, helicopters, and turboprop aircraft. Rolls-Royce also constructs and installs power generation systems. Its core gas turbine technology has created one of the broadest product ranges of aero-engines in the world, with 50,000 engines in service with 500 airlines, 2,400 corporate and utility operators and more than 100 armed forces, powering both fixed- and rotary-wing aircraft. Rolls-Royce Marine Power Operations (a subsidiary company) manufactures and tests nuclear reactors for Royal Naval submarines.

Aerospace

In 2019, Rolls-Royce delivered 510 Trent powerplants, while 5,029 large engines were installed, including 32% Trent 700s.
For business jets, research and development in the market niches is a $2 billion annual investment, for a predicted market of 8,500 to 9,000 aircraft over the 2020 decade.

Turbojets
 Rolls-Royce Avon
 Rolls-Royce Viper
 Rolls-Royce/Snecma Olympus 593
 Rolls-Royce RB162

Turbofans
 Eurojet EJ200
 General Electric/Rolls-Royce F136 (not developed)
 International Aero Engines V2500
 Rolls-Royce AE 3007
 Rolls-Royce BR700
 Rolls-Royce Conway
 Rolls-Royce RB211
 Rolls-Royce RB282 (not developed)
 Rolls-Royce Spey
 Rolls-Royce Tay
 Rolls-Royce Pegasus
 Rolls-Royce Trent
 Rolls-Royce Turbomeca Adour
 Turbo-Union RB199

Turboshafts
 LHTEC T800 (with Honeywell)
 MTR390 (with MTU and Turbomeca)
 Rolls-Royce Gem
 Rolls-Royce Model 250
 Rolls-Royce RR300
 Rolls-Royce RR500
 Rolls-Royce T406/AE 1107C-Liberty
 Rolls-Royce/Turbomeca RTM322

Turboprops
 Europrop TP400-D6 (as part of Europrop International)
 Rolls-Royce AE 2100
 Rolls-Royce T56

Rocket engines
 Larch
 RB545 (HOTOL)
 RZ.2

Marine

Gas turbines
 AG9140
 MT7
 MT30
 MT50
 RR4500
 Spey SM1A and improved SM1C
 Olympus TM1, TM1A and improved TM3B
 Tyne RM1A and improved RM1C
 WR-21

Propulsion
 Kamewa and Bird-Johnson Waterjets
 Kamewa Tunnel thruster
 MerMaid pod propulsion
 Ulstein Aquamaster Azimuth thruster
 Rolls-Royce MTU Engines

Submarine
 Nato Submarine Rescue System
 PWR1 reactor
 PWR2 reactor
 PWR3 reactor
 Zebra (battery)

Stabilizers
 Brown Brothers Legacy Stabilizers
 Brown Brothers Neptune or VM Stabilizers
 Brown Brothers Aquarius Stabilizers

See also 

 Aerospace industry in the United Kingdom
 GE Aviation, competing engine manufacturer
 Pratt & Whitney, competing engine manufacturer
 Power by the Hour

References

Notes

Bibliography
 Gunston, Bill. Development of Piston Aero Engines. Cambridge, UK. Patrick Stephens Limited, 2006. .
 Newhouse, John. The Sporty Game: The High-Risk Competitive Business of Making and Selling Commercial Airliners. New York: Alfred A. Knopf, 1982. .
 Pugh, Peter. The Magic of a Name: The Rolls-Royce Story, The First 40 Years. London: Icon Books, 2000. .
 Pugh, Peter.  The Magic of a Name: The Rolls-Royce Story, Part 2, The Power Behind the Jets.  London: Icon Books, 2001. .
 Pugh, Peter.  The Magic of a Name: The Rolls-Royce Story, Part 3, A Family of Engines.  London: Icon Books, 2002. .

Footnotes

External links 

 
 Rolls-Royce's annual report archive
 

Technology companies established in 1906
Manufacturing companies established in 1906
British companies established in 1906
1906 establishments in England
Aerospace companies of the United Kingdom
Aircraft engine manufacturers of the United Kingdom
Gas turbine manufacturers
Defence companies of the United Kingdom
Companies listed on the London Stock Exchange
Engineering companies of the United Kingdom
Rolls-Royce
British brands
Manufacturing companies based in London
Holding companies established in 2003
Holding companies of the United Kingdom
Collier Trophy recipients
Former nationalised industries of the United Kingdom
Marine engine manufacturers